Dugald Thompson could refer to:

 Dugald Thompson, the controversial winner of the Golden Hare and creator of Haresoft; see Hareraiser, a computer game

 Dugald Thomson (1849–1922), member of the Australian Parliament for North Sydney